The 1970 Syracuse Orangemen football team represented Syracuse University during the 1970 NCAA University Division football season. The team was led by 22nd-year head coach Ben Schwartzwalder and played their home games at Archbold Stadium in Syracuse, New York. Syracuse finished with a record of 6–4 and were not invited to a bowl game.

The season was marred because the head coach and university's refusal to resolve issues of systemic racism brought forth by the Syracuse 8 and their protest boycott.

Schedule

References

Syracuse
Syracuse Orange football seasons
Syracuse Orangemen football